Eduard Krčmář (born 26 March 1996) is a Czech motorcycle speedway rider.

Speedway career
He rode in the top tier of British Speedway riding for the Swindon Robins in the 2015 Elite League. He is a three times finalist in the 2014 Individual Speedway Junior World Championship, 2016 Individual Speedway Junior World Championship and 2017 Individual Speedway Junior World Championship.

He was champion of the Czech Republic after winning the Czech Republic Championship in 2020.

References 

1996 births
Living people
Czech speedway riders
Swindon Robins riders
People from Slaný
Sportspeople from the Central Bohemian Region